Hazel Kirke is a play in four acts written by American actor and dramatist Steele MacKaye.

Overview
The play was written between 1878 and 1879 in the town of Dublin, New Hampshire.  MacKaye meant it to be expressly for New York City's Madison Square Theatre, which MacKaye had recently renovated and completely remodeled.  Originally titled An Iron Will, the play toured Philadelphia, Baltimore and Washington until renovations on the Madison Square Theatre were complete.  It premiered there on February 4, 1880, and the original production became immensely successful; it starred actress Effie Ellsler in the title role and ran for 486 consecutive performances, the record of its time. before closing May 31, 1881.

Because MacKaye revolutionized the concept of multiple companies performing the same production simultaneously, by 1883 the play had been performed more than two thousand times.

Legacy

By the mid-1910s the play had been produced in England, Australia, Japan, and elsewhere.  In 1916 it was adapted into a film starring Pearl White and produced at the Whartons Studio in Ithaca, New York.

In 1987, a revamped version of Hazel Kirke by Mark Houston which added a musical score debuted at the Lake George Opera Festival.  The New York Times called the result "like watching a B movie; its kitschy charm wears thin after a short while."

Original cast
 Effie Ellsler ... Hazel Kirke
 Gabrielle Du Sauld ... Dolly Dutton (also later played by Georgia Cayvan)
 Mrs. Cecil Rush ... Emily Carringford (Lady Travers)
 Blanche Whiffen ... Mercy Kirke
 Annie Ellsler ... Clara, a maid
 Eben Plympton ... Arthur Carringford (Lord Travers)
 Charles Walter (C.W.) Couldock ... Dunstan Kirke
 Dominick Murray ... Aaron Rodney
 Thomas Whiffen ... Pittacus Green
 Joseph Frankau ... Methuselah Miggins
 Edward Coleman ... Barney O'Flynn, a valet
 Fred P. Barton ... Joe, a miller
 George Grey ... Dan, a miller 
 Henry Jones ... Thomas, a servant.

Notes

References
Murphy, Brenda. 1987. American Realism and American Drama, 1880–1940: 1880–1940. Cambridge University Press.

External links
 Hazel Kirke: A Domestic Comedy Drama in Four Acts (1880), via archive. org
 Program for 250th performance (October 8, 1880), via archive.org

Plays by Steele MacKaye
American plays adapted into films
1879 plays